Carl Hartman (5 June 1824 in Solna – 19 April 1884 in Örebro) was a Swedish botanist. He was the son of Carl Johan Hartman, also a botanist.

References

19th-century Swedish botanists
1824 births
1884 deaths
People from Solna Municipality